This article provides information on candidates who stood for the 1925 Australian federal election. The election was held on 14 November 1925.

By-elections, appointments and defections

By-elections and appointments
On 12 September 1923, John Hayes (Nationalist) was appointed as a Tasmanian Senator to succeed Thomas Bakhap (Nationalist).
On 17 October 1923, Walter Massy-Greene (Nationalist) was appointed as a New South Wales Senator to succeed Edward Millen (Nationalist).
On 22 July 1924, Joseph Hannan (Labor) was appointed as a Victorian Senator to succeed Stephen Barker (Labor).
On 10 November 1924, Jack Power (Labor) appointed as a New South Wales Senator to succeed Allan McDougall (Labor).
On 1 April 1925, William Gibbs (Labor) was appointed as a New South Wales Senator succeed Jack Power (Labor).
On 29 July 1925, Charles Grant (Nationalist) was appointed as a Tasmanian Senator to succeed George Foster (Nationalist).
On 25 August 1925, William Plain (Nationalist) was appointed as a Victorian Senator to succeed Edward Russell (Nationalist).
On 13 November 1925, the day before the election, Charles McDonald (Labor, Kennedy) died, leaving his seat to be won unopposed by the Nationalist candidate.
Subsequent to the election, but prior to the new Senate taking its place:
On 18 December 1925, Sir Henry Barwell (Nationalist) was appointed as a South Australian Senator to replace James O'Loghlin (Labor).
On 24 February 1926, Alexander McLachlan (Nationalist was appointed as a South Australian Senator to replace Benjamin Benny (Nationalist).

Defections
After Prime Minister Billy Hughes's resignation in 1923, the five Liberal Party members – Malcolm Cameron (Barker), Jack Duncan-Hughes (Boothby), Richard Foster (Wakefield), John Latham (Kooyong) and William Watt (Balaclava) – rejoined the Nationalist Party.
In 1925, Country MP Percy Stewart (Wimmera) resigned from the party. He contested his seat as an Independent Country candidate.

Retiring Members and Senators

Labor
Senator William Gibbs (NSW)

Nationalist
 Fred Bamford MP (Herbert, Qld)
 Frederick Francis MP (Henty, Vic)
Senator Benjamin Benny (SA) (see also above)
Senator Edmund Drake-Brockman (WA)

Country
 Joshua Whitsitt MP (Darwin, Tas)

House of Representatives
Sitting members at the time of the election are shown in bold text. Successful candidates are highlighted in the relevant colour. Where there is possible confusion, an asterisk (*) is also used.

New South Wales

Northern Territory

Queensland

South Australia

Tasmania

Victoria

Western Australia

Senate
Sitting Senators are shown in bold text. Tickets that elected at least one Senator are highlighted in the relevant colour. Successful candidates are identified by an asterisk (*).

New South Wales
Five seats were up for election. Two of these were for short-term vacancies: one caused by Nationalist Senator Edward Millen's death, which had been filled in the interim by Nationalist Walter Massy-Greene; and the other caused by Labor Senator Allan McDougall's death, which had been filled first by Jack Power and then by William Gibbs, both members of the Labor Party. The Labor Party was defending two seats. The Nationalist Party was defending three seats. Labor Senator John Grant was not up for re-election.

Queensland
Three seats were up for election. The Nationalist Party was defending three seats. Nationalist Senators Thomas Crawford, Harry Foll and Matthew Reid were not up for re-election.

South Australia
Three seats were up for election. The Nationalist Party was defending three seats. Labor Senators Bert Hoare, Charles McHugh and James O'Loghlin were not up for re-election.

Tasmania
Four seats were up for election. One of these was a short-term vacancy caused by Nationalist Senator Thomas Bakhap's death; this had been filled in the interim by Nationalist John Hayes. The Nationalist Party was defending four seats. Labor Senator James Ogden and Nationalist Senator Herbert Hays were not up for re-election.

Victoria
Four seats were up for election. One of these was a short-term vacancy caused by Labor Senator Stephen Barker's death; this had been filled in the interim by Labor's Joseph Hannan. The Nationalist Party was defending three seats. The Labor Party was defending one seat. Labor Senators John Barnes and Edward Findley were not up for re-election.

Western Australia
Three seats were up for election. The Nationalist Party was defending three seats. Labor Senators Charles Graham and Ted Needham and Nationalist Senator Walter Kingsmill were not up for re-election.

See also
 1925 Australian federal election
 Members of the Australian House of Representatives, 1922–1925
 Members of the Australian House of Representatives, 1925–1928
 Members of the Australian Senate, 1923–1926
 Members of the Australian Senate, 1926–1929
 List of political parties in Australia

Notes

References
Adam Carr's Election Archive - House of Representatives 1925
Adam Carr's Election Archive - Senate 1925

1925 elections in Australia
Candidates for Australian federal elections